John Clark was an English professional footballer who played as a forward.

Career
Born in Durham, Clark played for Bathgate, Bradford City and Cardiff City. For Bradford City, he made 6 appearances in the Football League, scoring once. For Cardiff City he made 8 appearances in the Southern Football League, scoring once.

Sources

References

Year of birth missing
Year of death missing
English footballers
Bathgate F.C. players
Bradford City A.F.C. players
Cardiff City F.C. players
English Football League players
Southern Football League players
Association football forwards